Cosmin Ionuț Ioniță (born 27 January 2003) is a Romanian professional footballer who plays as a full back or midfielder .

References

External links
 
 Cosmin Ionita at prosportbucuresti.ro

2003 births
Living people
Footballers from Bucharest
Romanian footballers
Association football defenders
Liga I players
Liga III players
LPS HD Clinceni players